Blízkov is a municipality and village in Žďár nad Sázavou District in the Vysočina Region of the Czech Republic. It has about 300 inhabitants.

Administrative parts
The village of Dědkov is an administrative part of Blízkov.

References

Villages in Žďár nad Sázavou District